Artur Marcin Rojek (born May 6, 1972) is the former guitarist and lead singer of the Polish alternative rock group Myslovitz. He and the lead guitarist Wojciech Powaga founded the Mysłowice-based group in 1992. He was also the guitarist, vocalist, and main songwriter for the dream pop band Lenny Valentino, which formed in 1998 and disbanded in 2001.

He is the artistic director of Off Festival, an annual music festival established in 2006, which was held in his hometown Mysłowice until 2009. Now the  festival takes place in Katowice.

On 20 April 2012, Myslovitz informed about Rojek's departure in an official message signed by all members of the group.

In April 2014, Rojek released his debut solo album, Składam się z ciągłych powtórzeń.

Of his early trajectory, Rojek states, "I started my musical adventure with OMD. Then there were early U2 records and first guitar UK bands, like [the] Housemartins." He has also namechecked the House of Love, the Stone Roses, Ride, the High, the Boo Radleys and Galaxie 500.

Discography
 Studio albums

Music videos

References

1972 births
Living people
People from Mysłowice
Polish male guitarists
Polish rock singers
Polish lyricists
20th-century Polish  male singers
21st-century Polish male singers
21st-century Polish singers
21st-century guitarists